Sir Algernon Eustace Hugh Heber-Percy, KCVO (born 2 January 1944) is a British landowner, farmer and public official.

Heber-Percy was born in 1944, to Daphne Parker Bowles and the army officer Brigadier Algernon George William Heber-Percy (1904–1961), who remodelled a large part of the gardens at the Heber-Percy family's ancestral home, Hodnet Hall, Shropshire.

Having served in the Army for four years, Heber-Percy returned to live in Hodnet Hall in 1966; he studied agriculture at a local college and has managed the family's farming estates thereafter. He has also extensively renovated the house with his wife Jane, daughter of the 3rd Viscount Leverhulme. He has been involved in a number of organisations, including periods as a trustee of the National Gardens Scheme and as a member of the National Trust's regional committee. Since 1988, he has been president of the Shropshire and Mid Wales Hospice, now called Severn Hospice. In 1986, he was appointed a deputy lieutenant for Shropshire and served as high sheriff for the 1987–88 year; he was appointed vice-lord lieutenant in 1990 and then served as lord lieutenant from 1996 to 2019.

Heber-Percy retired as lord lieutenant in January 2019, at the age of 75. He had been appointed a Knight Commander of the Royal Victorian Order in 2014.

Honours
  He was made a Knight Grand Cross of the Order of the Royal Victorian Order on 31 December 2013 by HM Queen Elizabeth II. This allowed him the title "Sir" and the Post Nominal Letters "KCVO" for Life.
  He was made a Knight of Justice of the Order of St John. Within the Order this allowed him the post nominal letters "KStJ" for life. Awarded upon taking office as Lord Lieutenant of Shropshire.
 He served as honorary colonel of 5th Battalion the Shropshire and Herefordshire Light Infantry from 1998-1999.
 He served as honorary colonel of the West Midlands Regiment from 1999-2005.
 In 2017 He was awarded the honorary degree of Doctor of Letters (D.Litt.) from the University of Chester.

References 

Living people
1944 births
21st-century British landowners
21st-century British farmers
Lord-Lieutenants of Shropshire
Knights Commander of the Royal Victorian Order
Knights of Justice of the Order of St John